William Spiers Glenn  (21 February 1877 – 5 October 1953) was a New Zealand rugby union player who played for the All Blacks on their 1905 tour.  He later became a Reform Party Member of Parliament in New Zealand.

Early life
Glenn was born in Greymouth in 1877 and moved to Manaia, Taranaki, with his family as a child. He was a keen sportsman, and as well as playing rugby, he became secretary of the Manaia Tennis Club. He was a member of the Egmont Racing Club and owned several race horses.

In 1904, Glenn was elected a member of the Manaia Town Board. He owned a  dairy farm on the Waimate plain.

Rugby union career
Glenn was a loose forward, and occasionally played at hooker. He became a  rugby representative in 1899. He made his All Blacks debut in 1904, playing against the touring British Isles team. He subsequently toured with the 1905 Originals. In all, Glenn played 19 matches for the All Blacks, including two test matches.  He scored no points and never played in a losing All Blacks side.

Military service
In World War I, Glenn served with the Royal Field Artillery, reaching the rank of second lieutenant. In 1916, he was awarded the Military Cross for conspicuous gallantry and ability as an observing officer. His citation reads that "he was exposed to heavy shell fire for several hours, but with great coolness and judgment corrected the fire of his battery throughout, and sent back constant reports on the situation."

Parliamentary career

Glenn was elected to the Rangitikei electorate in the 1919 general election, but was defeated in 1928. In 1935, he was awarded the King George V Silver Jubilee Medal.

He was the first All Black to be elected to the New Zealand Parliament.

References

1877 births
1953 deaths
British Army personnel of World War I
Members of the New Zealand House of Representatives
New Zealand international rugby union players
New Zealand military personnel of World War I
New Zealand MPs for North Island electorates
New Zealand recipients of the Military Cross
New Zealand sportsperson-politicians
Reform Party (New Zealand) MPs
Rugby union hookers
Rugby union locks
Rugby union players from Greymouth
Taranaki rugby union players
Unsuccessful candidates in the 1928 New Zealand general election